Raising the Flag on the Three-Country Cairn is a historic photograph taken on 27 April 1945, which was the last day of the Second World War in Finland. It depicts a Finnish Army patrol of Battle Group Loimu, Infantry Regiment 1, raising the Finnish flag on the three-country cairn between Norway, Sweden, and Finland to celebrate the last German troops withdrawing from Finland. The photograph was taken by the commander of Infantry Regiment 1, Colonel Väinö Oinonen (alternatively V.J. Oinonen). It became a widely circulated symbol of the end of World War II in Finland.

Background 

Amidst World War II, Finland fought both the Winter War of 1939–1940 and Continuation War of 1941–1944 against the Soviet Union. During the latter, Finland cooperated with Nazi Germany, who deployed the 200,000-strong 20th Mountain Army led by Generaloberst Lothar Rendulic to Finnish Lapland. In September 1944, Finland agreed to a separate peace with the Soviet Union, which required that Finland disarm or expel any German soldiers from Finland. The demand led to the Lapland War; the 20th Mountain Army started withdrawing north towards occupied Norway with the Finnish Army's III Corps, led by General Hjalmar Siilasvuo, in pursuit. By November, the war came to an effective end when most German units had withdrawn to Norway and the Lyngen Line—although some entrenched German forces still remained in Finland at Kilpisjärvi in the corridor leading to the border tripoint between Norway, Sweden, and Finland.

On 25 April 1945, after it was determined that the final German formations in Finnish territory were withdrawing, a 60-strong battle patrol led by Captain Valkonen was assigned to reconnoitre if Finnish Lapland was free from Wehrmacht forces. The detachment was assembled from 1st Company, Battle Group Loimu, Infantry Regiment 1, and departed on its mission at 1:00 pm the same day from southern Kilpisjärvi. The ski patrol advanced north-west towards Norway for around  until it was split in two near the Saana fell. The smaller group would approach the Norwegian border along the road while the bulk of the patrol would continue with Captain Valkonen towards the three-country cairn farther off. They reached the cairn by 1:15 am on 26 April after skiing approximately  more. Pioneer Antti Poikola attached a small flag of Finland to the cairn and the patrol reported back by radio that no Germans had been sighted on Finnish soil. Valkonen and his team shot three gun salutes at the cairn before leaving; the shots rang out across the fells and startled a Swedish border guard unit nearby.

Around noon of 26 April, Major Martti Santavuori, commander of the battalion, and a mixed Finnish–Swedish patrol arrived at the tripoint. A German  unit approached them from Norway, and, with knowledge that they would not engage the Swedes, Major Santavuori signaled the German leader to meet up at the border. An Austrian  soon skied closer and they discussed the war, both past and future. Major Santavuori and the  saluted, shook hands and bid each other "as good a future as fate has to offer" before parting ways.

Flag-raising 
On 27 April, commander of Infantry Regiment 1, Colonel Väinö Oinonen (alternatively V.J. Oinonen), arrived at the cairn to inspect the situation with a detachment of soldiers including photography specialists, a larger flag, and a better flagpole. The war flag of Finland was ceremoniously raised on the cairn and Colonel Oinonen took the titular photo—with the -high Golddabakti fell of Norway in the background. Amidst the festivities, a shout of "?!" ("Who's there?!") surprised the Finnish soldiers. Even though the area had been inspected, a German unit lay waiting in position on the Norwegian side of the border. The flag-raising soldiers took cover behind the cairn. Battle was avoided after a Swedish army officer approached to act as an intermediary. Soon after, Colonel Oinonen resolved the situation with two , who shared German Juno cigarettes with him. The officers saluted each other and went their ways; the time was 1:30 pm. On 28 April, General Siilasvuo sent a telegram to Finnish Commander-in-Chief C.G.E. Mannerheim, reporting that the  had been expelled from Northern Finland.

Aftermath 
The picture became widely circulated in Finland and was an example of an iconic war photograph in Finnish World War II history. It was compared to similar pictures, such as the American Raising the Flag on Iwo Jima and the Soviet Raising a Flag over the Reichstag, although it was not considered to have become as symbolic as they were. In fact, the Finnish popular memory of the conflict relied equally on illustrations, such as the cover of The Unknown Soldier, a 1954 war novel about the Continuation War.

See also 

 Aftermath of World War II
 Hitler and Mannerheim recording
 Liberation of Finnmark
 List of iconic photographs

References

Notes

Citations

Bibliography 
 
 
 

Finland in World War II
Black-and-white photographs
Flags of Finland
World War II photographs
Special events flags
April 1945 events in Europe
1945 photographs
Flags in art